Baker Publishing Group is a Christian book publisher that discusses historic Christian happenings for its evangelical readers. It is based in Ada, Michigan and has six subdivisions: namely Bethany House, Revell, Baker Books, Baker Academic, Chosen, and Brazos Press.

History
The company was founded in 1939 by Herman Baker in Grand Rapids, Michigan. The company mainly publishes content that covers many issues ranging from family life to theology, mostly within a broad evangelical framework.

Furthermore, Baker also publishes books and ministry resources for pastors and church leaders, concentrating on topics such as preaching, worship, pastoral ministries, counseling and leadership. Apart from that, they also publish content for lay Christians on topics such as discipleship, spirituality, encouragement, relationships, marriage, parenting and the intersection of Christianity and culture.

In June 2014, Baker announced that it had acquired the publishing rights for Regal Books from Gospel Light.

Subdivisions

Bethany House

Baker is regarded as a "pioneer" in publishing Christian fiction.

Revell
The Fleming H. Revell Company was established in 1870 by Christian Evangelist D.L. Moody and his brother-in-law, Fleming H. Revell. The two men identified a market for practical books that would help bring the Christian faith to everyday life. In 1992, Revell was absorbed by Baker.

Chosen
The Chosen publishing enterprise began in 1971. In 1985, the company was absorbed into the Revell publishing Group. When Revell was bought by Baker, the Chosen imprint remained as a distinct unit within the newly expanded company.

Brazos Press
Brazos Press is a publisher of theology and theologically-based cultural criticism with an orientation toward postliberal viewpoints within mainline Protestantism.

References

Further reading
Byle, Ann. (2014). The Baker Book House Story Grand Rapids: Baker Books. 

Fisher, Allan. (1995). Fleming H. Revell Company: The First 125 Years, 1870-1995. Grand Rapids: Fleming H. Revell.

External links
Baker Book House

Book publishing companies based in Michigan
Christian mass media companies
Christian publishing companies
Companies based in Grand Rapids, Michigan
Religion in Grand Rapids, Michigan
Protestantism in Michigan
Publishing companies established in 1939
1939 establishments in Michigan